The 2016 UEFA Futsal Championship, commonly referred to as UEFA Futsal Euro 2016, was the 10th edition of the UEFA Futsal Championship, the biennial international futsal championship organised by UEFA for the men's national teams of Europe. It was hosted for the first time in Serbia, following a decision of the UEFA Executive Committee on 20 March 2012. Serbia was chosen ahead of other bids from Bulgaria and Macedonia.

The final tournament was contested from 2 to 13 February 2016 by twelve teams, eleven of which joined the hosts Serbia after overcoming a qualifying tournament. The matches were played in the Belgrade Arena in the city of Belgrade.

Qualification

A total of 46 UEFA nations entered the competition (including Scotland which entered for the first time), and with the hosts Serbia qualifying automatically, the other 45 teams competed in the qualifying competition to determine the remaining 11 spots in the final tournament. The qualifying competition, which took place from January to September 2015, consisted of three rounds:
Preliminary round: The 24 lowest-ranked teams were drawn into six groups of four teams. Each group was played in single round-robin format at one of the pre-selected hosts. The six group winners and the best runner-up advanced to the main round.
Main round: The 28 teams (21 highest-ranked teams and seven preliminary round qualifiers) were drawn into seven groups of four teams. Each group was played in single round-robin format at one of the pre-selected hosts. The seven group winners qualified directly to the final tournament, while the seven runners-up and the best third-placed team advanced to the play-offs.
Play-offs: The eight teams were drawn into four ties to play home-and-away two-legged matches to determine the last four qualified teams.

Qualified teams
The following 12 teams qualified for the final tournament.

Final draw
The final draw was held on 2 October 2015, 12:00 CEST (UTC+2), at the Belgrade Town Hall in Belgrade, Serbia, where former Serbian footballer Dejan Stanković was unveiled as the tournament ambassador and made the draw. The 12 teams were drawn into four groups of three teams. The teams were seeded according to their coefficient ranking, with the hosts Serbia (assigned to position A1 in the draw) and the title holders Italy automatically placed into Pot 1.

Each group contained one team from Pot 1, one team from Pot 2, and one team from Pot 3. For political reasons, Russia and Ukraine could not be drawn in the same group or in groups scheduled to be played on the same day (due to a potential clash of teams and clash of fans). Therefore, if Russia were drawn in Group B, Ukraine had to be drawn in Group C or D, and if Russia were drawn in Group C or D, Ukraine had to be drawn in Group A or B.

Venues

All matches were played at the Kombank Arena. During the course of the championship, the arena was renamed from Kombank Arena to Belgrade Arena, for sponsorship reasons. Originally the Pionir Arena was proposed to host group stage matches.

Squads

Each national team have to submit a squad of 14 players, two of whom must be goalkeepers. If a player is injured or ill severely enough to prevent his participation in the tournament before his team's first match, he can be replaced by another player.

Group stage
The schedule of the tournament was confirmed on 28 October 2015.

The group winners and runners-up advanced to the quarter-finals.

Tiebreakers
The teams were ranked according to points (3 points for a win, 1 point for a draw, 0 points for a loss). If two or more teams were equal on points on completion of the group matches, the following tie-breaking criteria were applied, in the order given, to determine the rankings:
Higher number of points obtained in the group matches played among the teams in question;
Superior goal difference resulting from the group matches played among the teams in question;
Higher number of goals scored in the group matches played among the teams in question;
If, after having applied criteria 1 to 3, teams still had an equal ranking, criteria 1 to 3 were reapplied exclusively to the group matches between the teams in question to determine their final rankings. If this procedure did not lead to a decision, criteria 5 to 9 applied;
Superior goal difference in all group matches;
Higher number of goals scored in all group matches;
If only two teams had the same number of points, and they were tied according to criteria 1 to 6 after having met in the last round of the group stage, their rankings were determined by a penalty shoot-out (not used if more than two teams had the same number of points, or if their rankings were not relevant for qualification for the next stage).
Lower disciplinary points total based only on yellow and red cards received in the group matches (red card = 3 points, yellow card = 1 point, expulsion for two yellow cards in one match = 3 points);
Drawing of lots.

All times were local, CET (UTC+1).

Group A

Group B

Group C

Group D

Knockout stage
If a match was drawn after 40 minutes of regular play, an extra time consisting of two five-minute periods would be played. If teams were still leveled after extra time, a penalty shoot-out would be used to determine the winner. In the third place match, the extra time would be skipped and the decision would go directly to kicks from the penalty mark.

Bracket

Quarter-finals

Semi-finals

Third place match

Final

Final ranking

Goalscorers
6 goals

 Serik Zhamankulov
 Ricardinho
 Álex
 Miguelín
 Mario Rivillos

5 goals

 Mladen Kocić
 Romulo

4 goals

 Zoltán Dróth
 Douglas Júnior
 Sergei Abramov
 Eder Lima

3 goals

 Augusto
 Rodolfo Fortino
 Alex Merlim
 Leo Jaraguá
 Slobodan Rajčević
 Miloš Simić
 Raúl Campos
 Mykola Grytsyna

2 goals

 Fábio Cecílio
 Bebe
 Pola
 Dmytro Bondar

1 goal

 Vitaliy Borisov
 Fineo De Araujo
 Eduardo
 Rizvan Farzaliyev
 Rafael
 Vedran Matošević
 Tihomir Novak
 Josip Suton
 Michal Holý
 Michal Kovács
 Jiří Novotný
 Lukáš Rešetár
 Radim Záruba
 János Trencsényi
 Mauro Canal
 Daniel Giasson
 Humberto Honorio
 Gabriel Lima
 Alessandro Patias
 Aleksandr Dovgan
 Leo Higuita
 Dauren Nurgozhin
 Dinmukhambet Suleimenov
 Chingiz Yesenamanov
 Pedro Cary
 Ivan Milovanov
 Nikolai Pereverzev
 Robinho
 Slobodan Janjić
 Marko Pršić
 Stefan Rakić
 Kristjan Čujec
 Igor Osredkar
 Gašper Vrhovec
 Andresito
 Denys Ovsyannikov
 Dmytro Sorokin
 Yevgen Valenko

1 own goal
 Tomáš Koudelka (playing against Italy)
 Péter Németh (playing against Spain)
 Robinho (playing against Croatia)

Awards
Golden Player:  Miguelín
Golden Shoe:  Miguelín and Mario Rivillos, 6 goals, 4 assists (5 games)
Silver Shoe:  Álex (Spain) 6 goals, 2 assists (5 games)
Bronze Shoe:  Ricardinho 6 goals, 0 assists (3 games)
All-star squad:
 Miodrag Aksentijević (goalkeeper)
 Leo Higuita (goalkeeper)
 Paco Sedano (goalkeeper)
 Sergei Abramov
 Álex
 Douglas Júnior
 Mladen Kocić
 Leo Jaraguá
 Gabriel Lima
 Miguelín
 Marko Perić
 Ricardinho
 Mario Rivillos
 Robinho

Sponsorship

Broadcasters

 Azerbaijan: CBC Sport
 Brazil: Globosat
 Caribbean: ESPN
Central America: ESPN
 Europe: Eurosport
 Hungary: MTV
 Iran: Varzesh
 Kazakhstan: Kazakhstan Radio and Television Corporation
 Malaysia: Astro
 Middle East and North Africa: beIN Sports
 Mexico: ESPN Latin America
 Portugal: TVI
 Russia: Match TV
 Serbia: RTS
 South America: ESPN
 Spain: Mega (Spanish television channel) (Atresmedia)
 United States: ESPN (English) and ESPN Deportes (Spanish)

References

External links

UEFA Futsal EURO Serbia 2016, UEFA.com

 
2016
2016
Uefa
Uefa
Football in Belgrade
International sports competitions in Belgrade
2010s in Belgrade
February 2016 sports events in Europe